Zdeněk Valenta is a Czechoslovak retired slalom canoeist who competed in the 1960s. He won six medals at the ICF Canoe Slalom World Championships with a gold (C-2: 1967), four silvers (C-2: 1961; C-2 team: 1961, 1967, 1969) and a bronze (C-2: 1969).

References

Czechoslovak male canoeists
Czech male canoeists
Possibly living people
Year of birth missing (living people)
Medalists at the ICF Canoe Slalom World Championships